Whittard is a surname. Notable people with the surname include:

 Walter Frederick Whittard (1902–1966), professor of geology

See also
 Whittard of Chelsea, international retailer of coffee, tea, and various items